Marrupa Airport  is an airport serving Marrupa, Niassa Province, Mozambique.

See also
Transport in Mozambique

References
Directory of Airports in Mozambique
Great Circle Mapper
 Google Earth

External links

Airports in Mozambique